Napoleon at Leipzig is a board wargame published by Operational Studies Group in 1979 that simulates the Battle of Leipzig.

Development and publication history
Napoleon at Leipzig was designed by Kevin Zucker, with artwork by Rick Barber, Larry Catalano, Louis Dumoulin, Charles Kibler, Ted Koller and Felicien von Myrbach-Rheinfeld, and was published by Operational Studies Group in 1979. Clash of Arms then bought the rights and published three editions, before Operational Studies Group regained the rights and published the 5th edition. Counting all editions, over 20,000 copies have been sold.

Gameplay
Napoleon at Leipzig is a two-player wargame focused on the Battle of Leipzig in 1813, where Napoleon's French forces were surrounded by a force twice its size. The game system uses an "I Go, You Go", alternating series of turns, where one player moves and attacks, followed by the other player. Players have a choice, in order of increasing complexity, of Basic rules, Grand Tactical rules, or Campaign rules. Each player has an Army Commander, who uses Officers to transmit orders to move and fight to the units. Without an Officer within suitable distance, a unit will not attack, and can only move to get closer to the Officer.

Components
The game components of the first edition are:
 two 22" x 34" 6-color mapsheets
 400 1/2" counters, including 90 blanks
 an 8-page rulebook
 a 32-page study folder
 an errata card
 a 6-sided die

By comparison, the game components of the fifth edition are:
 three maps (two 22" x 34", one 17" x 22")
 560 1/2" counters
 22-page rulebook
 study folder
 4-page folder with random card instructions
 20 pages of charts, schedules and player aids
 100 random event cards

Reception
In Issue 78 of Puzzles & Games, Nick Palmer thought that players who liked the simple SPI quadrigame Napoleon's Last Battles "will love this game." However, Palmer noted "The trouble is that these pretty advanced leadership rules continue to build on a simple basic structure, and it one plays the full Grand Tactical Game, the effect is top-heavy." Palmer concluded by giving the game an above average Excitement rating of 4 out of 5, saying, "I suspect that Napoleon's Last Battles fans will not want to be bothered by all the extra rules."

In Issue 53 of Moves, Ian Chadwick didn't like the campaign game's Allied victory condition around the destruction of the Leipzig bridge, saying it did not reflect the actual battle. He also found many of the darker-colored counters difficult to read. But he concluded that overall "this is a good, playable game", and gave the game an "A" for playability, a "B" for historical accuracy, and a "C" for component quality.

In Issue 21 of Phoenix (September/October 1979), Doug Davies found the game components "physically rather disappointing" but in terms of simulation, playability and enjoyment, "it scores favourable marks." At the end of an in-depth examination of the game, he concluded, "All in all this is an excellent game which I would highly recommend. It succeeds in its prime objective of illustrating the command system of the Napoleonic era extremely effectively and does it in a style which makes it entertaining and enjoyable to play."

In the 1980 book The Complete Book of Wargames, game designer Jon Freeman called this "a stunningly beautiful game [...] everything is calculated to please the eye." He also noted the "excellent historical notes and a good order of battle." Freeman was less enthused about the new command control system, saying, "The added command features are interesting, but they do make things top-heavy in that department for what is otherwise a fairly simple system." He also noted issues with game balance, saying, "The French seem to do a bit too well. Whether this is caused by the system or design bias is difficult to determine, but it takes the edge off what is otherwise a very nice effort." Freeman concluded by giving the game an Overall Evaluation of "Good."  

Retired Colonel Bill Gray reviewed the 5th edition for Wargamer, and his verdict was "Get the game." He even encouraged players who already owned a previous copy of the game to buy this edition: "The graphics are state of the art, the map is bigger for more maneuvers, the clash at Hanau is included as a bonus and the game system so radically updated as to nearly count as original." Gray admitted that although he collected wargames for research purposes, he rarely played them. "Napoleon at Leipzig is one game I will actually play, and play again." He concluded "As Russian Prince Pyotr Bagration said of the bold advance of the French 57th Ligne at Borodino, Bravo Messieurs, c'est superbe!"

Awards
At the 1980 Origins Awards, Napoleon at Leipzig won the Charles S. Roberts Award for Best Pre-20th Century Game of 1979.

Other reviews and commentary

1st edition
Zone of Control #7
Moves #7
Fire & Movement #24
International Wargamer Vol. 5 #2
The Wargamer Vol. 1 #4
Panzerfaust #63
Space Gamer #50
Simulacrum #19
Battle Flag Vol. 1 #26

5th edition
Consimworld News/Board Game Geek

References

Clash of Arms games
Napoleonic Wars board wargames
Operational Studies Group games
Origins Award winners
Wargames introduced in 1979